Karl Wilhelm Wefring (11 October 1867 – 28 September 1938) was a Norwegian physician and politician who served as Minister of Defence in the 1920s.

Political career  
Wefring was first elected to the Parliament of Norway as an independent for South Hedemark for the period 1916–1818. He was the Norwegian Minister of Defence 1920–1921, 1923-1924 and 1926. He served in the parliament for Oslo, representing the Liberal Left Party in the period 19125-1927 where he held the position as president of the Odelsting.

Professional career 

Wefring became attending physician at the national institution with responsibility for the mental ill (Statens sinnssykevesen) in 1919. He was "medisinaldirektør" ("director of health") in Norway from 1927 to 1930, and director for the National Hospital from 1930 to 1937.

References 

1867 births
1938 deaths
Defence ministers of Norway